Susan Sizemore (March 24, 1951 – July 21, 2020) was an American author of both romance and science fiction novels.

Biography
Susan Sizemore began writing her own stories as a child. As an adult, she wrote fan fiction set in the Star Trek universe. She later began writing original romance novels. In 1991, when she was 40, she won the Romance Writers of America Golden Heart Award, presented to a previously unpublished author. Three days later, she sold her debut novel, a time-travel romance called Wings of the Storm. Within several years, she was able to begin writing full-time.

Later in her career, she was asked to write a media tie-in novel based on the television series Forever Knight. Her book, Forever Knight: A Stirring of Dust, marked the first time she had written about vampires. This endeavor inspired her to create her own original series about a vampire world. The resulting series, known as Laws of the Blood, is a fantasy series with some romantic elements. Sizemore later created a second vampire world. Books in the new series, Primes, are paranormal romances, focusing much more on the relationships than the fantasy world. Although both series focus on vampires, Sizemore has created distinct and separate universes. Her background in cultural anthropology has helped her to create unique cultures for her vampires. Sizemore gives her vampires modern human problems, as they struggle with relationships and raising children. Each novel also prominently features a human character, allowing the books to show several very different perspectives on the worlds.

Sizemore has been nominated for two Romantic Times awards.

Sizemore died on July 21, 2020, at the age of 69.

Bibliography

Novels 

 A Kind of Magic (2006)
 Dish of the Day (2010)
 A Little Death (2011)
 The Devil You Know (2011)
 Vampire Family Values (2012)
 That God Won't Hunt (2012)

Time travel romance 

 Sammy's Song (2011) previously called In My Dreams (1994)
 My Own True Love (1994)
 The Autumn Lord (1996)
 One of These Nights (1997)
 Written in Ink (2010)
 Virgin of the Spring (2012)
 One Riot, One Ranger (2011)

Historical romance 

 My First Duchess (1993)
Nothing Else Matters (1995)
The Price of Innocence (1999)
 The Price of Passion (2001)
On A Long Ago Night (2000)

Contemporary romance 
Stranger by Her Side (1997)
His Last Best Hope (2000)

Science fiction 
Forever Knight: A Stirring of the Dust (1997)
Walking on the Moon (2005)
Gates of Hell (2007)

Laws of the Blood

Primes

Time Search
Wings of The Storm (1992)
After the Storm (1996)

Dr Cliff and Lord North 
Memory of Morning (2011)
My Dearest (2012)

MacLeods of Skye Court 
Too Wicked to Marry (2002)
Captured Innocence (2003)
Scandalous Miranda (2005)

Living Dead Girl 

 Black Snow (2012)
 Bad Wolf (2013)
 Caged Glass (2015)

Blue Death 

 Shattered Journey (2015)
 Golden Lash (2015)
 Blue Death (2015)

Children of the Rock
with Marguerite Krause
Moons' Dreaming (1999)
Moons' Dancing (2000)

Anthologies and collections

References

External links

20th-century American novelists
21st-century American novelists
American fantasy writers
American romantic fiction writers
American science fiction writers
American women short story writers
American women novelists
1951 births
2020 deaths
Women science fiction and fantasy writers
Women romantic fiction writers
20th-century American women writers
21st-century American women writers
20th-century American short story writers
21st-century American short story writers